The ninth season of the American television medical drama Grey's Anatomy began airing in the United States on the American Broadcasting Company (ABC) on September 27, 2012, with the season premiere "Going, Going, Gone" and consists of 24 episodes with the season finale "Perfect Storm" airing on May 16, 2013. The season was produced by ABC Studios, in association with Shondaland Production Company and The Mark Gordon Company; the showrunners being Tony Phelan and Joan Rater. The season was officially released on DVD as a 6-disc box-set under the title of Grey's Anatomy: The Complete Ninth Season - Everything Changes on August 27, 2013 by Buena Vista Home Entertainment.

The season follows the characters dealing with the aftermath of the season 8 plane crash that claimed the life of Lexie Grey (Chyler Leigh) and upon rescue Mark Sloan (Eric Dane), who dies after sustaining injuries from the crash. Derek Shepherd (Patrick Dempsey) finds his surgical career in doubt after badly damaging his hand but Callie Torres (Sara Ramirez) ultimately manages to save his hand. The show's protagonist Meredith Grey (Ellen Pompeo) deals with the loss of her half-sister Lexie and later discovers that she is pregnant. Cristina Yang (Sandra Oh)  is severely traumatized upon rescue and later decides to take up her fellowship in Minnesota. Arizona Robbins (Jessica Capshaw), another survivor of the plane crash, upon return, realizes that her leg had to be amputated to save her life, reacts badly to this, becoming bitter and blaming her wife Callie and her former friend Alex Karev (Justin Chambers). To prevent the doctors' court case from being thrown out, Owen Hunt (Kevin McKidd) decides to divorce Yang, but the two agree to start again. The hospital itself becomes liable for the crash, putting its future in extreme doubt prompting the 4 crash survivors and Torres to purchase the hospital. Miranda Bailey (Chandra Wilson) marries her partner Ben Warren (Jason George), April Kepner (Sarah Drew) returns home to Ohio, but is brought back by Hunt to rejoin the hospital and she restarts her relationship with Jackson Avery (Jesse Williams).

The season ended with an average of 12.51 million viewers and ranked #26 which was higher than the previous 2 seasons and in the 18-49 key demographic ranked at #10. Ellen Pompeo won the Favorite TV Drama Actress at the 39th People's Choice Awards and the show itself won the Favorite Network TV Drama. It was announced by ABC on May 10, 2013 that the tenth season of Grey's Anatomy would begin in the fall of 2013.

Episodes 

The number in the "No. in series" column refers to the episode's number within the overall series, whereas the number in the "No. in season" column refers to the episode's number within this particular season. "U.S. viewers in millions" refers to the number of Americans in millions who watched the episodes live. Each episode of this season is named after a song.

Cast and characters

Main 
 Ellen Pompeo as Dr. Meredith Grey 
 Sandra Oh as Dr. Cristina Yang
 Justin Chambers as Dr. Alex Karev
 Chandra Wilson as Dr. Miranda Bailey
 James Pickens Jr. as Dr. Richard Webber
 Sara Ramirez as Dr. Callie Torres
 Eric Dane as Dr. Mark Sloan
 Kevin McKidd as Dr. Owen Hunt
 Jessica Capshaw as Dr. Arizona Robbins
 Sarah Drew as Dr. April Kepner
 Jesse Williams as Dr. Jackson Avery
 Patrick Dempsey as Dr. Derek Shepherd

Recurring 
 Camilla Luddington as Dr. Jo Wilson
 Gaius Charles as Dr. Shane Ross
 Jerrika Hinton as Dr. Stephanie Edwards
 Tessa Ferrer as Dr. Leah Murphy
 Jason George as Dr. Ben Warren 
 Loretta Devine as Adele Webber
 Constance Zimmer as Dr. Alana Cahill
 William Daniels as Dr. Craig Thomas
 Debbie Allen as Dr. Catherine Avery
 Justin Bruening as Matthew Taylor
 Neve Campbell as Lizzie Shepherd
 Sarah Chalke as Casey Hedges
 Tina Majorino as Dr. Heather Brooks
 Hilarie Burton as Dr. Lauren Boswell
 Bianca Taylor as Elena Bailey 
 Charles Michael Davis as Dr. Jason Myers
 Steven Culp as Dr. Darren Parker
 Eddie Jemison as Stan Grossberg
 Adina Porter as Dr. Ramsey
 Nicole Cummins as Paramedic Nicole

Production

Development 
Grey's Anatomy was renewed by ABC on May 10, 2012. In June 2012, ABC set the premiere date of Grey's Anatomy to September 27, 2012, and it would remain in the Thursday 9:00pm timeslot that it has had since the third season. In October 2012, it was reported that this season would have the same episode count as season 8, meaning it would have a total of 24 episodes. Shonda Rhimes revealed that the season 9 finale would not revolve around a 'disaster' episode.

Casting 
In May 2012, it was announced that 6 original cast-mates, Ellen Pompeo, Sandra Oh, Justin Chambers, Chandra Wilson, James Pickens, Jr. and Patrick Dempsey had renewed their contracts for another 2 seasons, as Meredith Grey, Cristina Yang, Alex Karev, Miranda Bailey, Richard Webber and Derek Shepherd respectively. In July 2012, it was announced that cast member Eric Dane would not be returning to Grey's Anatomy as a series-regular, and would leave after 2 episodes to give his character a proper ending. In addition, Chyler Leigh requested to be released from her contract to spend more time with her family and her character was killed off in the season 8 finale, while Kim Raver also departed from the show following the events of the season 8 finale, having declined the offer of a contract extension. Other series regulars, Sara Ramirez, Kevin McKidd, Jessica Capshaw, Sarah Drew, and Jesse Williams all returned to the series as regulars, though Capshaw would not have a major role in the first few episodes because of her maternity leave.

In August 2012, it was announced that Camilla Luddington, Gaius Charles and Tina Majorino had been cast as Jo Wilson, Shane Ross, and Heather Brooks respectively; these characters would be the new interns of Seattle Grace-Mercy West. TVGuide later reported that even with all of the recurring cast being added to Grey's Anatomy for the new season that True Blood star Camilla Luddington is the only actress with an option to become a series-regular. In September 2012, it was announced that Jerrika Hinton and Tessa Ferrer had been cast as new interns Stephanie Edwards and Leah Murphy respectively. In August 2012, it was announced that Debbie Allen would reprise her role as Catherine Avery at sometime in series, and she is set to direct the third episode. In September 2012, it was announced that Steven Culp would be cast as a new doctor at a new hospital, and would be known as Dr. Parker. 

In September 2012, it was announced that William Daniels, former Boy Meets World star, and Jason George would reprise their roles as Dr. Craig Thomas, and Ben Warren respectively. In September 2012, TVLine reported that Bones's Andrew Leeds had been cast in a potentially recurring role for the ninth season. In December 2012, Wetpaint reported that Constance Zimmer had been cast in a recurring role as Dr. Cahill and would appear in at least 4 episodes. In November 2012, it was announced that Neve Campbell, known for her role in Scream (1996), would be cast as one of Derek's sisters. It was not until late November that her role was revealed as Liz Shepherd, a therapist. In November 2012, it was announced that in 2013, someone would die on Grey's Anatomy. TVGuide then reported that Loretta Devine, who is known as Adele Webber, would be reprising her role for 2 episodes, and that she would be the one to die. In November 2012, TVLine reported that Nip/Tuck alum Roma Maffia was cast in a recurring role as a member of the hospital board. In December 2012, TVLineTVLine and Wetpaint reported that Ringer and Switched at Birth star, Justin Bruening, was cast as a paramedic known as Matt. 

In January 2013, it was announced that Gaius Charles, Tina Majorino, Jerrika Hinton and Tessa Ferrer were all given the option to become series-regulars if Grey's Anatomy were to be renewed. Sarah Chalke is set to guest-star in an episode in the spring, as TVLine reported in January 2013. It was announced by E! Online on March 29, One Tree Hill alumni Hilarie Burton will be cast in a recurring role as a specialist in an investigation going on in the hospital. Her character is to arrive on the twenty-second episode of the season. However, this later turned out to be untrue as Burton ended up portraying a specialist doctor named Lauren Boswell.

Reception

Ratings 
Grey's Anatomy's ninth season opened up to 11.73 million viewers with a 4.4/12 Nielsen rating/share in the 18–49 demographic. The viewership for the episode was an 11% increase from the previous season premiere, which was viewed by a total of 10.38 million people. The rating was a 7% increase from the previous season premiere, which received a 4.1/10 Nielsen rating/share in the 18–49 demographic. The Nielsen score additionally registered the show as the week's highest-rated drama in the 18–49 demographic. As of December 2012, "Going, Going, Gone" has served as the season's most-viewed episode. "Run, Baby, Run" is the season's least-viewed episode, with 8.17 million viewers and a 2.9/8 Nielsen rating/share in the 18-49 demographic. At the time, the season finale was the series' lowest-watched season finale with 8.99 million viewers and 3.1 in the 18-49 rating demographci.

Live + SD ratings

Live + 7 Day (DVR) ratings

Critical response 

The season received positive reviews with critics praising numerous aspects of the long-running medical drama including the bonds of the characters with each other and its connection with the audience. Robert Bianco of USA Today noted that after 9 seasons, "There's still life left in Grey's." What Culture gave a positive review for the season, "Grey's Anatomy has developed into a fine example of how a TV show can mature beyond its initial purpose." Toronto Star called it "a solid return to form." TV Fanatic gave a largely positive review to the season, "Grey's Anatomy always knows how to bring the drama and they did not fail in the Season 9." 

Melissa Maerz of Entertainment Weekly also gave a positive response stating, "There's still one good reason to keep watching: Where else can you find such deep friendships between co-workers?" Margaret Lyons of New York Magazine wrote that the first part of the season "has been mostly a downer, thanks in part to a whole bunch of people dying at the beginning of the season and also the shocking lack of interesting romances."

Examiner.com reviewing the season finale wrote, "[Grey's] delivered yet another epic and emotional season finale that pushes our characters in challenging new directions." The site added, "'Perfect Storm' gets 5 out of 5 stars. This storm brought on all kinds of emotional strife and death that truly tests the seasoned doctors and pushes them to their element. They bond together, guiding each other through the dark and as the dust settles from this mayhem, there are casualties of all kinds. The tragedy that leaves us hanging until next fall is one hell of a thrill ride full to the brim with shocks."

DVD release

Notes

References 

2012 American television seasons
2013 American television seasons
Grey's Anatomy seasons